The Oregon Ducks men's ice hockey is a college ice hockey program that represents the University of Oregon. The Ducks play off campus at 2,700-seat The Rink Exchange. They are a member of the American Collegiate Hockey Association (ACHA) at the ACHA Division II level. The team is a member of the Pacific 8 Intercollegiate Hockey Conference (PAC-8) within the ACHA. The University does not currently have an NCAA varsity team, and thus the club team is the highest level of hockey offered by the University.

The team will move up to Division I in the 2022-23 season. .

History 
The Ducks have been playing since 1989 and are a student-run, student-focused organization supported primarily by member dues as well as donations. Since the club's start, the team has won five PAC-8 Championships in ten appearances.

References

College men's ice hockey teams in the United States
Oregon Ducks